is an unmanned. railway station in Horonobe, Teshio District, Hokkaidō, Japan. According to JR Hokkaidō, only one person uses the station daily, on average.

Lines
Hokkaido Railway Company
Sōya Main Line Station W68

Layout
Double track loop, two side platforms, single siding.

Adjacent stations

References

Stations of Hokkaido Railway Company
Railway stations in Hokkaido Prefecture
Railway stations in Japan opened in 1925